The 41st Infantry Regiment was an infantry regiment in the Imperial Japanese Army. The regiment was attached in 1940 to the 9th Brigade of the 5th Division of the 21st Army. The regiment participated during the Second Sino-Japanese War, and World War II.

Organization
1st Battalion
2nd Battalion
3rd Battalion

Infantry Regiments (Imperial Japanese Army)
Military units and formations established in 1940
Kokoda